Ostrovo is a village in northeastern Bulgaria, part of Razgrad Province, located in the geographic region of Ludogorie. As of March 2016, the village has a population of 2968 inhabitants.

Municipality

Public institutions 
The village has a community center "Father Paisii", primary school "Hristo Botev" and kindergarten "Joy". 3½ km east of the village is a hunting farm "Voden". The local football club Adaspor competes in the A district football group.

References 

Villages in Razgrad Province